Amphidiscosida is an order of hexactinellid sponges characterized by amphidisc spicules, that is, spicules having a stellate disk at each end. They are in the class Hexactinellida and are the only order classified in the monotypic subclass Amphidiscophora. Species of the order Amphidiscosida have existed since the Ordovician period, and still flourish today.

Families
Hyalonematidae Gray, 1857
Monorhaphididae Ijima, 1927
Pheronematidae Gray, 1870

References

Hexactinellida
Sponge orders